Blind Fury is a 1989 American action comedy film directed by Phillip Noyce and starring Rutger Hauer, Brandon Call, Terry O'Quinn, Lisa Blount, Randall "Tex" Cobb, and Noble Willingham. The screenplay by Charles Robert Carner is a loosely based, modernized remake of Zatoichi Challenged, the 17th film in the Japanese Zatoichi film series.

The film follows Nick Parker (Hauer), a blind, sword-wielding Vietnam War veteran, who returns to the United States and befriends the son of an old friend. Parker decides to help the boy find his father, who has been kidnapped by a major crime syndicate.

Plot
While serving in Vietnam, American soldier Nick Parker was blinded by a mortar explosion. Rescued by local villagers, he recovered his health and, though he remains blind, was trained to master his other senses and be an expert swordsman.

20 years later, having returned to the United States, he visits old army buddy Frank Deveraux, only to find that Deveraux is missing. Parker meets Frank's son Billy and his mother Lynn, Frank's ex-wife. Minutes later, Frank's evil boss Claude MacCready's henchman Slag arrives with two corrupt police officers to kidnap Billy to use as leverage over Frank. Nick stops them; the officers are killed, Billy is knocked unconscious, but Slag mortally wounds Billy's mom before he escapes. With her last words, Lynn tells Nick to take Billy to his father in Reno, Nevada.

At a rest stop on the way to Reno, Parker tells Billy about his mother's death. Billy runs away from Nick and is grabbed by Slag and some henchmen. Slag escapes as Nick rescues Billy a second time, and Billy and Nick (now called Uncle Nick) become fond of one another.

They reach Reno and find Frank's girlfriend Annie, who agrees to take them to Frank. After escaping yet another attempted kidnapping by MacCready's men, Annie suggests they hide out at the home of her friend Colleen. Annie takes Nick to MacCready's casino, where Frank is making MacCready's drugs. Annie returns to Colleen's to watch over Billy while Nick saves Frank. Nick and Frank are reunited; Frank takes the key ingredient in MacCready's drugs and destroys the lab. Avoiding casino security, Nick and Frank escape and head to Colleen's to reunite Billy with his dad; they find Colleen dead, Billy and Annie kidnapped, and a note instructing them to bring the drugs to MacCready's mountain penthouse in exchange for Billy and Annie.

Knowing it is an ambush, Nick and Frank arm themselves with homemade napalm bombs. After killing all of MacCready's men, they find MacCready holding Billy and Annie at gunpoint. MacCready hired a Japanese assassin to kill Nick, but after an epic swordfight between the two, Nick wins by electrocuting the assassin in a hot tub. Slag shoots Nick in the shoulder and Nick throws his sword at Slag, impaling him. MacCready then tries to interfere only to be stopped by Frank. Billy escapes his rope and throws Nick's sword to him, but it lands in the hot tub. As Slag reaches for his gun, Nick grabs hold of the assassin's sword and slashes him, cutting him in half and causing him to fall out of a window.

Frank is reunited with Billy and Annie, and they leave for San Francisco. Nick drops his ticket, choosing not to go. Billy follows Nick, telling him that he needs him. Nick says that while he is fond of Billy, he should go back to his father. Nick crosses the street and vanishes as a bus passes him. Saddened by Nick's departure, Billy throws a toy dinosaur off the bridge where Nick catches it. Billy calls out to Nick one last time and tells him that he'll miss him. As Frank catches up to Billy, they embrace. Nick smiles or sheds a tear, puts on his sunglasses while holding Billy's toy dinosaur with left arm in a sling, and walks off into the distance.

Cast

 Rutger Hauer as Nick Parker
 Terry O'Quinn as Frank Deveraux
 Brandon Call as Billy Deveraux
 Noble Willingham as Claude MacCready
 Lisa Blount as Annie Winchester
 Randall "Tex" Cobb as Slag
 Nick Cassavetes as Lyle Pike
 Rick Overton as Tector Pike
 Meg Foster as Lynn Deveraux
 Shō Kosugi as The Assassin
 Charles Cooper as Ed Cobb
 Weasel Forshaw as Popcorn
 Roy Morgan as Six Pack
 Tim Mateer as Snow
 Sharon Shackelford as Colleen
 Woody Watson as Crooked Miami Cop
 Alex Morris as Crooked Miami Cop
 Mark Fickert as Bus Station Cop
 Jay Pennison as Casino Bodyguard
 Tiger Chung Lee as Casino Bodyguard

Production
Blind Fury marked the producing debut of actor Tim Matheson. Matheson produced the film having been a fan of the Zatoichi film series. Matheson and producer Daniel Grodnik spent seven years trying to find a distributor for the film. In 1986, the producers landed a deal with film distributor Tri-Star Pictures. According to Grodnik, various writers and directors were attached to the project before Phillip Noyce was hired as the film's director.

Hauer calls Blind Fury one of his "most difficult jobs" because of the combination of swordplay with playing a blind man; and Hauer spent a month training with Lynn Manning whose first words to him were "I don't get confused about what I see ...".

Filming took place around the Midwestern United States, where the cast and crew underwent humid weather conditions. Of the intense weather conditions, Matheson stated, "We shot in the Midwest and West, and it was incredibly hot. Everything was burning up. We ended up buying a three-foot pool for the cast and crew to wade through to cope with the heat." After principal photography was completed, a sequel to the film was planned, but never materialized.

Reception
On their syndicated television program Siskel and Ebert and the Movies, film critics Roger Ebert and Gene Siskel gave the film "Two thumbs up".

Reviewer Ian Jane of DVD Talk wrote, "Hauer does a commendable job in the lead and is reasonably convincing as a blind man. Like its Japanese predecessors, there is some humor interjected into the storyline that is handled well without becoming overbearing or taking over the action sequences."

On Rotten Tomatoes Blind Fury holds an approval rating of 56% based on 16 reviews, with a rating average of 4.9 out of 10.

References

External links
 
 

1989 films
1989 martial arts films
1980s action comedy films
American action comedy films
American martial arts films
American remakes of Japanese films
Films about blind people
Films directed by Phillip Noyce
Films scored by J. Peter Robinson
Films set in Reno, Nevada
Interscope Communications films
TriStar Pictures films
Vietnam War films
1980s English-language films
1980s American films